The list of shipwrecks in September 1877 includes ships sunk, foundered, grounded, or otherwise lost during September 1877.

1 September

3 September

4 September

5 September

6 September

7 September

8 September

9 September

10 September

11 September

12 September

13 September

14 September

15 September

16 September

17 September

18 September

19 September

21 September

22 September

24 September

25 September

27 September

28 September

{{shipwreck list item
|ship=St. Croix 
|flag=
|desc=The barque was abandoned in the Atlantic Ocean. All on board were rescued by the barque Giovanni D..
}}
 

29 September

30 September

 

Unknown date

References

Bibliography
Ingram, C. W. N., and Wheatley, P. O., (1936) Shipwrecks: New Zealand disasters 1795–1936.'' Dunedin, NZ: Dunedin Book Publishing Association.

1877-09
Maritime incidents in September 1877